Eduard Franciscus "Ed" de Goeij (anglicised to de Goey; born 20 December 1966) is a Dutch former professional football goalkeeper. In a 20-year career, he played for Sparta Rotterdam, Feyenoord, Chelsea and Stoke City. He played 31 times for the Netherlands national team.

Club career
De Goey signed for Feyenoord in 1990 and stayed there for seven years. During his time in Rotterdam, he missed a total of just eight games and won one Eredivisie title (in 1993) and four KNVB Cups in 1991, 1992, 1994 and 1995. He was awarded the Dutch Golden Shoe in 1994.

De Goey joined Chelsea in June 1997 from Feyenoord for £2,250,000. He was first choice goalkeeper for the first three years of his six years spell, and was a member of the sides that won the League Cup, the Cup Winners' Cup (both in 1998) and the FA Cup in 2000. In 1999–2000, he set club records for most appearances (59) and clean sheets (27) during a season, both since surpassed by Frank Lampard and Petr Čech respectively. De Goey later lost his place in the side to Italian Carlo Cudicini and made just 25 appearances in his final three seasons. He was released by Chelsea in May 2003.

He joined Stoke City in August 2003 and became the club's first choice goalkeeper for the 2003–04 season where he made 38 appearances. He faced competition with Steve Simonsen in 2004–05 and made 17 appearances before losing his place completely in 2005–06 and was released at the end of the season.

International career
De Goey played 31 times for the Netherlands, including every game for his country at the 1994 FIFA World Cup when the Netherlands reached the quarter-finals, losing to eventual winners Brazil.

Coaching career
On 6 July 2007, De Goey joined Queens Park Rangers as a first team coach, but chairman Gianni Paladini terminated his contract before the end of the season. In July 2010, De Goey joined RKC Waalwijk as a goalkeeping coach, a position he held until 2014, when he parted ways with the club. A few weeks later, De Goey joined DHC Delft in the Dutch Sunday Hoofdklasse A League. As of 2018, De Goey is goalkeeping coach at Dutch fifth tier side VOC Rotterdam.

Career statistics

Club

A.  The "Other" column constitutes appearances and goals in the FA Charity Shield, UEFA Champions League, UEFA Cup Winners' Cup, and UEFA Super Cup.

International

Honours
Feyenoord
Eredivisie: 1992–93
KNVB Cup: 1990–91, 1991–92, 1993–94, 1994–95
Dutch Supercup: 1991

Chelsea
FA Cup: 1999–2000
Football League Cup: 1997–98
FA Charity Shield: 2000
UEFA Cup Winners' Cup: 1997–98
UEFA Super Cup: 1998

Netherlands
FIFA World Cup fourth place: 1998

Individual
Dutch Goalkeeper of the Year: 1993 
Golden Shoe: 1994
Most clean sheets in the Premier League: 1999–2000

References

External links
 
 Netherlands Profile at OnsOranje

1966 births
Living people
Footballers from Gouda, South Holland
Expatriate footballers in England
Dutch expatriate footballers
Dutch footballers
Netherlands international footballers
Eredivisie players
Sparta Rotterdam players
Feyenoord players
Chelsea F.C. players
Stoke City F.C. players
Premier League players
Association football goalkeepers
1994 FIFA World Cup players
UEFA Euro 1996 players
1998 FIFA World Cup players
UEFA Euro 2000 players
Queens Park Rangers F.C. non-playing staff
English Football League players
FA Cup Final players